Saleh Al-Muhaimeed (born September 20, 1993) is a Saudi football player who plays for Al-Saqer as a winger.

References

1993 births
Living people
Saudi Arabian footballers
Al-Taawoun FC players
Al-Hazem F.C. players
Al-Badaya Club players
Al-Saqer FC players
Place of birth missing (living people)
Saudi First Division League players
Saudi Professional League players
Saudi Second Division players
Saudi Fourth Division players
Association football wingers